Sweetwater Country Club is a golf course and country club located in Sugar Land, Texas.

History
The club was built in 1957. In 2003, two teenagers convicted of stealing golf carts were given settlements because SCC did not verify whether they were guests who were allowed to take golf carts. In 2017, the club expanded its facilities by creating a training area and gym area for its members.

References

Buildings and structures in Fort Bend County, Texas
1957 establishments in Texas
Golf clubs and courses in Texas
Sugar Land, Texas